Jason Edwin Simpson  (born January 25, 1971) is an American football coach. He is head football coach at the University of Tennessee at Martin, a position he has held since 2006. Simpson  has led the UT Martin Skyhawks to two  Ohio Valley Conference championships, in 2006 and 2021.

Simpson's son, Ty Simpson, is a top quarterback recruit for the Class of 2022 who signed with Alabama.

Head coaching record

References

External links
 UT Martin profile

1971 births
Living people
American football quarterbacks
Chattanooga Mocs football coaches
Delta State Statesmen football coaches
Jacksonville State Gamecocks football coaches
Mississippi State Bulldogs football players
Southern Miss Golden Eagles baseball players
Texas State Bobcats football coaches
UT Martin Skyhawks football coaches
High school football coaches in Mississippi
People from Ellisville, Mississippi